Queensway Carleton Hospital (QCH) is a 355-bed hospital located in the west end of Ottawa, Ontario, Canada that delivers acute care and is west Ottawa's only full-service hospital.

QCH was officially opened on October 5, 1976, by then Ontario Premier William Davis and currently serves a population of more than 500,000 and is the secondary referral center for the Ottawa Valley. QCH focuses on its cornerstone health care programs: emergency, childbirth, Geriatric, mental health, rehabilitation, medical and surgical, and critical care.

In 2015 QCH obtained its "Accreditation with Exemplary Standing" from Accreditation Canada, the highest award level of accreditation with an overall compliance score of 99.4 (2014/2026 compliant standards) and meeting all 31/31 Required Organizational Practices.

The executive management team is led by President and chief executive officer Dr. Andrew Falconer and the medical team reports to Chief of Staff Dr. Katalin Kovacs. Dr. Falconer replaced Tom Schonberg who died in February 2019.

In fiction, The hospital was mentioned in the episode The Smile in “Homeland” where the character Carrie Mathison, received a temporary new identity, “Kate Morrissey”, for a CIA mission, with one of the facts of Morrissey being born in the hospital. However, the hospital did not have a maternity ward at the time of her birth and her place of birth is incorrectly listed as Ottawa when at that time the hospital within Nepean (before amalgamation of the city of Ottawa).

Operational funding
QCH is funded by the Ontario Ministry of Health and Long-Term Care (a ministry of the Ontario Government), the QCH Foundation as well as by a variety of public and individual donations.

By the numbers (2021-2022)
Services:
Emergency visits – 80,045
Day stay surgeries – 16,004
Surgical inpatients – 2,814
Medical inpatients – 5,641
Mental Health patients – 12,686
Rehabilitation outpatient visits - 16,845
Rehabilitation inpatients - 610
Births – 2,473
Clinic & day program visits – 86,846
Diagnostic Imaging tests – 138,382
Cardiopulmonary procedures – 59,836
Personnel:
2528 Employees
350 Physicians
990 Nurses
136 Volunteers

Expansion
In 1986, QCH's first expansion took place from the original 1976 building, adding an additional 160 acute care beds, ambulatory care services, diagnostic imaging services, and additional administrative space.

Between 1998 and 2000, in response to provincial hospital restructuring and amalgamation of services, QCH completed Phase 1 of its expansion, which included a new birthing centre, which included the incorporation of the former Grace Hospital's Newborn Program and an expanded diagnostic imaging program, which included QCH's first CT scanner.

Between 2003 and 2005, Phase 2 of the expansion was approved to allow for significant growth in the emergency department, the busiest single-site emergency department in Eastern Ontario with almost 78,000 visits yearly in 2017; in-patient medicine; and surgery units, ICU and surgery capacity; and incremental growth in other clinical and support areas.

Between 2008 and 2010, in partnership with Cancer Care Ontario and The Ottawa Hospital Regional Cancer Center Program, the Irving Greenberg Family Cancer Center (IGFCC) was opened on the QCH campus to provide cancer diagnosis, treatment, surgery and ambulatory support. The facility includes 3x radiation treatment machines, 2x clinics and 33x chemotherapy spaces. The first patients were treated in April 2010.

In 2012, a ten-year Phase 3 expansion project was completed to provide the following improvements: 10 new Operating Room suites, a new and expanded Ambulatory Care Centre, a new Rehabilitation Centre, a new Physiotherapy Centre and a 15-station Hemodialysis unit. The 140,000 sq ft expansion also included renovations to the pharmacy and laboratory departments and significantly expanded the diagnostic imaging department, doubling the number of MRI and CT scanners and additional nuclear medicine and biopsy units.

In 2014, Ontario Premier Kathleen Wynne and Minister of Energy Bob Chiarelli announced the approval of a new 34-bed Acute Care of the Elderly (ACE) Unit at QCH. The $9.6 million project addresses the special needs of geriatric patients and will help prepare elderly patients for a smooth transition to home. The unit will be only the second of its kind in Ontario after Mount Sinai Hospital in Toronto.

The original 1976 QCH structures covered 240,000 sq ft; after multiple phases of expansion and investment in 1986, 1998, 2005, 2008, 2009 and 2012, QCH now covers 680,000 sq ft.

NCC / $1 rent contract
Queensway Carleton Hospital (QCH) was built on a 51-acre parcel of land in the former city of Nepean, Ontario that was owned by the National Capital Commission (NCC), and since QCH's opening in 1976, the hospital had paid approximately $1 million in rent to the federal government. The rent was $23,000 per year, in the contract until 2013, when the rent was expected to increase to reflect the current market value of the land parcel.

Pierre Poilievre, Federal MP representing the riding of Nepean—Carleton, attempted to reduce the rent of the hospital to $1 per year during his first term in office. Poilievre introduced a bill in November 2005 seeking to reduce the hospital's rent, which saw support from the Conservative Party of Canada and New Democratic Party.

Poilievre was re-elected in the 2006 Federal election and was named Parliamentary secretary to John Baird, President of the Treasury Board. Together, the two men unveiled a plan in August 2006 which would use Treasury Board funds to pay the NCC rent on behalf of the hospital, such that the hospital continued to pay only $1 in rent.

References

Hospital buildings completed in 1976
Hospitals in Ottawa
Hospitals established in 1976
1976 establishments in Ontario